Taschenberg is a surname of German origin. People with that name include:

 Ernst Ludwig Taschenberg (1818-1898), German entomologist, father of Ernst Otto Wilhelm
 Ernst Otto Wilhelm Taschenberg (1854-1923), German entomologist, son of Ernst Ludwig

See also
 Opernhaus am Taschenberg, a former theatre in Dresden, Saxony, Germany
 Taschenbergpalais, a grand hotel in Dresden, Germany
 

Surnames of German origin